Berit Dybing (born 1998), known as Ber, is an American indie pop singer-songwriter. She has released two EPs: And I’m Still Thinking About That (2022) and Halfway (2023).

Early life and education
Dybing grew up in Walker, Minnesota. She is of Norwegian heritage and her name is of Scandinavian origin, although her friends and family always referred to her as the shortened "Ber". She took lessons in music, guitar, and piano as a child, supported by her parents. In 2016, she graduated from Bemidji High School in Bemidji, Minnesota. In high school, she listened to a lot of folk music and indie pop, including Mumford & Sons and The Lumineers, but did not listen to radio pop. After high school, she took a gap year and participated in a program at Trøndertun Folk High School in Trondheim, where she focused on jazz and started a folk band with three other students. She was accepted into a vocal performance program at Leeds Conservatoire and moved to the UK with one of her bandmates as well as her then boyfriend. She graduated from the school in 2020, completing her last semester via Zoom due to the COVID-19 pandemic. In December 2020, with her visa expired, she moved back to Minnesota.

Career
In April 2021, Ber released her first song, "Bad For Me". Dybing released her second song, "Feels So Easy", the same year. Those two songs, along with four other songs, were part of her debut EP, And I'm Still Thinking of That, released in 2022.

In March 2022, Ber performed at South by Southwest.

In February 2023, Dybing released her second EP, Halfway, via AWAL. It includes 6 songs including "Boys Who Kiss You in Their Car" and "Your Internet Sucks". The EP is about Dybing unsuccessfully trying to get over a man who ghosted her.

Tours

Headlining
 Halfway Across America Tour (2023)

Opening act
 Sigrid - How To Let Go Tour (2022) - U.S. shows

References

Living people
1998 births
21st-century American musicians
21st-century American women musicians
Musicians from Minnesota
People from Walker, Minnesota